Jadranka Travaš-Sejdić  is a New Zealand academic,  and as of 2018 is a professor at the University of Auckland.

Academic career

After an undergraduate at the University of Zagreb in Croatia and a PhD titled  'Study of the interactions and structure in polyelectrolyte copolymer gel systems based on acrylamide monomers'  at the University of Auckland, Travaš-Sejdić joined the staff, rising to full professor.

Travaš-Sejdić is co-founder of  spin-out Spot Check.

Honours and awards 
In 2017, Travaš-Sejdić was elected as a Fellow of the Royal Society of New Zealand.

In 2018 the New Zealand Association of Scientists awarded Travaš-Sejdić the Shorland Medal.

In 2019, Travaš-Sejdić was awarded the Hector Medal by the Royal Society of New Zealand.

Selected works

References

External links
  
 
 

Living people
New Zealand women academics
Year of birth missing (living people)
University of Auckland alumni
University of Zagreb alumni
Academic staff of the University of Auckland
21st-century New Zealand women scientists
New Zealand materials scientists
Croatian chemists
Croatian emigrants to New Zealand
Fellows of the Royal Society of New Zealand